The Misiones Open, or the Abierto de Misiones, is a golf tournament on the TPG Tour, the official professional golf tour in Argentina. First held in 1999, it has always been held at the Tacurú Golf Club, in Posadas, Misiones Province.

The tournament not held from 2001 to 2004, 2015 or 2016.

Winners

PO – won following playoff

References

External links
TPG Tour – official site

Golf tournaments in Argentina
Posadas, Misiones